Cavadas may refer to

Localities in Portugal
A locality in the parish of Arrentela, Seixal municipality
A locality in the parish of Louriçal, Pombal municipality

Surname
Cavadas (surname)